Eric Albronda (born November 18, 1945) is an American musician. Albronda was the first drummer for Blue Cheer, briefly, prior to being replaced by Paul Whaley.   He also co-produced (with Leigh Stephens) Red Weather, the first solo album by former Blue Cheer guitarist Leigh Stephens, as well as the eponymous solo album by one of Stephens' post Blue Cheer bands, Pilot.

The group Pilot had as its vocalist Bruce Stephens, often confused with Leigh Stephens. Eric Albronda co-produced the Pilot album with Bruce Stephens at Trident Studios in London. The recordings were done in 1971 and released on RCA Records. The song "Fillmore Shuffle" was covered by Sammy Hagar.

References

External links
Blue Cheer website/historical site

American male drummers
American record producers
American music managers
Living people
1945 births
Blue Cheer members
20th-century American drummers
21st-century American drummers
20th-century American male musicians
21st-century American male musicians